Samed Yeşil (born 25 May 1994) is a German professional footballer who plays as a striker for Oberliga Niederrhein club Ratingen 04/19.

Formed at Bayer Leverkusen, he moved as a teenager to Liverpool in 2012. In 2015, he was loaned to FC Luzern.

Yeşil has represented Germany up to under-19 level. He was particularly successful in their under-17 team, whom he helped become runners-up in the European Championship and third place at the World Cup in 2011, finishing as top scorer of the former and second top at the latter.

Club career

Early career
Yeşil was born in Düsseldorf, but grew up in Krefeld. He started playing football in local club CFR Links, aged just six and then he played for BV 04 Düsseldorf. At age of eleven he was offered trial at Bayer 04 Leverkusen, which he accepted. In 2010, he reached the final of German Junior championship, which his team lost 1–0 to Eintracht Frankfurt. Next season he scored 22 goals in 24 matches for B-Junioren (U17/U16) and was moved one level up.

Yeşil scored 57 goals in 71 matches in the Bayer Leverkusen youth teams between 2010 and 2012. Yeşil made five appearances for the Leverkusen first team in his breakthrough year of 2012–13.

Liverpool
Liverpool signed Yeşil for a price believed to be £1 million on 30 August 2012 after attracting the attention of manager Brendan Rodgers, who moved quickly to secure the 18-year-old's signature.

Yeşil's first game for Liverpool was in an Under-21 match against Chelsea, with the Reds winning 4–1. He shortly after got his first call-up to the senior squad after that, remaining an unused substitute in a 5–3 UEFA Europa League group stage win away to BSC Young Boys of Switzerland on 20 September. Six days later, Yesil made his senior debut in the Football League Cup third-round game against West Bromwich Albion, starting in a 2–1 win at The Hawthorns. He also appeared in the next round against Swansea City, in which Liverpool succumbed to a 3–1 home defeat.

On 7 December 2012, after coming back from injury, Yeşil scored his first goal in a Liverpool shirt with a half-volley lob over the goalkeeper to put Liverpool 3–1 up in a 4–1 win over Crystal Palace at The Academy in the U21 Professional Development League, after coming off the bench as a substitute. In February of the following year, after rupturing his anterior cruciate ligament on international duty with Germany U19, he was sidelined for rest of the season.

On 7 October 2013, Yeşil made his comeback as a substitute in a 5–0 win against Tottenham Hotspur in the U21 Premier League. He then again ruptured his anterior cruciate ligament in training and was out of the season. Yeşil made his return from injury coming on as a substitute on 19 August 2014 in a U21 Premier League game against Sunderland. On 12 September, he scored his first goal since his return from injury in a 4–0 win over West Ham. After suffering further injury setbacks, he made his first start in 6 months against Tottenham Hotspur at White Hart Lane on 17 April 2015, scoring twice as Liverpool U21s won 3–1.

On 31 August 2015, Yeşil joined Luzern on a season-long deal. He made his non-competitive debut for the club against 1. FC Kaiserslautern on 4 September, scoring twice in three minutes as a second-half substitute in a 5–1 win. His Swiss Super League debut came nine days later, against Grasshopper Club Zürich, replacing Marco Schneuwly for the final fifteen minutes of a 3–3 draw. On 27 September, he scored his first senior goal, the game's only in a win over FC Zürich at the Swissporarena.

On 10 June 2016, he was released from Liverpool at the end of his contract.

Panionios
On 15 January 2017, Yeşil joined Panionios on a two-and-a-half-year contract for an undisclosed fee. He made his debut for the club in a 2–0 away win against Panetolikos. On 17 May 2017, thanks to a close-range effort by the German striker, Panionios won 1–0 against AEK Athens at the Olympic Stadium of Athens, in the 2016–17 Play Offs.

On 14 July 2017, Panionios returned to UEFA Europe League after nine years of absence with a 2–0 home win over Slovenia’s Gorica at the first leg of the second qualifying round of the Europa League. Yesil scored a goal in each half to give Panionios a victory at Nea Smyrni Stadium, on the debut of manager Michalis Grigoriou. On the second leg of the second qualifying round of the Europa League, Yesil scored another goal, his third in this round restored lead from close range following Kapić penalty in a 3–2 away win. On 24 September 2017, he scored his first league goal for the season in a 4–1 win against AEL. On 25 October 2017, he scored in the 93rd minute with a backheel in a 2–1 away win against Aris for the Greek Cup.

KFC Uerdingen 05
On 3 September 2018, Yeşil returned to Germany joining KFC Uerdingen 05 after not signing a new contract with Panionios. He left the club on 1 July 2019 after the expiry of his contract having played just 10 minutes of first team football in his two appearances for the club. After failing to find a new club in the summer transfer window, he trained with German 5th division club TSV Meerbusch in order to maintain his fitness.

Ankara Demirspor
On 26 December 2019, Yeşil signed for Turkish third division club Ankara Demirspor on a free transfer.

FC Homburg
Yeşil moved to Regionalliga West side VfB Homberg in October 2020.

International career
Yeşil is Turkish-German. He has played for the German U-19 team. He is eligible to play for both the German and Turkish national teams at senior level. Until now, he has not decided for which national team he is going to play for. According to Turkish media, his former teammate Nuri Şahin who is also Turkish-German and a Turkish international, tried to convince him to choose the Turkish national team. Turkish national team head coach Fatih Terim wanted him in the Turkish national team.

Career statistics

Honours 
Germany U17
 UEFA European Under-17 Football Championship: Runners-up (2011)
 FIFA U-17 World Cup: third place (2011)

Individual
 UEFA European Under-17 Championship top scorer: 2011
 FIFA U-17 World Cup Silver Shoe: 2011

References

External links 

 
 
 
 

1994 births
Living people
Sportspeople from Krefeld
German footballers
Germany youth international footballers
German people of Turkish descent
Association football forwards
Bayer 04 Leverkusen players
Bayer 04 Leverkusen II players
Liverpool F.C. players
FC Luzern players
Panionios F.C. players
KFC Uerdingen 05 players
Ankara Demirspor footballers
VfB Homberg players
Bundesliga players
Regionalliga players
3. Liga players
Swiss Super League players
Super League Greece players
TFF First League players
Oberliga (football) players
German expatriate footballers
Expatriate footballers in England
Expatriate footballers in Switzerland
Expatriate footballers in Greece
German expatriate sportspeople in England
German expatriate sportspeople in Switzerland
German expatriate sportspeople in Greece
Footballers from North Rhine-Westphalia